Isaac Ramaitsane "Shakes" Kungwane (2 February 1971 – 28 May 2014) was a South African football midfielder who played for Kaizer Chiefs, Jomo Cosmos, Pretoria City and Manning Rangers. During his spell at Kaizer Chiefs he wore the number 11 jersey after Nelson Dladla.

Club career
Kungwane, a staunch Orlando Pirates fan, started playing at Alexandra Blackpool and was spotted by Vincent Williams, the head of Kaizer Chiefs development. He started out professionally at Jomo Cosmos often being overshadowed by Thomas Madigage and August Makalakalane. He left after a loan spell to Milan FC and joined Chiefs where Nelson Dladla gave him the number 11. Kungwane snubbed an offer a few years earlier when Mamelodi Sundowns' Zola Mahobe failed to lure him with a briefcase of money. Kungwane played made his debut on 28 March 1991 against Hellenic FC. He is remembered showboating when Chiefs was leading 6–0 and doing a "Show Me Your Number" and sending SABC cameras to the sky while the ball was still at his feet. Kungwane's career was almost cut short by a crunching tackle by a robust Sam Kambule in the Charity Spectacular in 1992 he was sidelined for 8 months. When he was nursing his injury he developed weight problems which plagued him until the rest of his career. After a loan spell to Pretoria City he regained his form. He came back to Chiefs and scored spectacular goals and he eventually played his international debut in 1996. He left Chiefs in 1998 after a lack of game time. In 1999, Gordon Igesund contacted him an asked if he could "save" his career. Kungwane moved to Durban for R150 000. He described the move as "his last chance" to revive his career.

Goals
Kungwane claimed that throughout his career he scored less than six goals in a Sowetan interview. He scored a goal against Michau Warriors' Calvin Marlin from the centre line and a curved shot from a direct corner kick against Dinonyana which earned him a national call up in 1996.

International career
He made his international debut on 18 September 1996 in a 2-0 win over Australia coming in as a sub for David Nyathi in the 63rd minute in the Four Nations Cup. He played his last international only 3 days later in a 0-0 against Ghana as a substitute for Thomas Madigage in the 75th minute.

Style of play
Paul Dolezar always made comments about his wizardry, accurate and tricky passing. At times he would ask where is the ball because he would pass facing the opposite way but would get into trouble with other coaches.

Weight problems
During 1992 when he was nursing his knee injury, Kungwane had developed weight problems. His diet consisted of pap, meat and burgers which made him hate hard training.

Personal life
Kungwane married Busisiwe Precious in 2002. They had three children. Kabelo, Neo and Thato.

Death
Kungwane died on 28 May 2014 after being in ICU for 2 days. He died from complications with diabetes  Kungwane had been sick and was admitted on numerous occasions around April and was re-admitted again on 26 May 2014. Gordon Igesund, Kungwane's former coach said, "It’s terrible to hear that and very sad to think about his passing on. He was a lovely person and very humble and with so much respect of people. May his soul rest in peace." Lucas Radebe tweeted "Deepest sympathy to Shakes Kungwane's family on his passing today. Great friend & teammate. Really funny guy. He will be missed,"

Memorial service and funeral
There were soft road closures on 12th, 13th Avenues between Roosevelt Road and Vincent Tshabalala Road (London Road) in Johannesburg for his memorial service which took place at Three Square in Alexandra. Kungwane was buried in Fafung, Brits in North West.

Retirement
Kungwane retired in 2002 and played semi-professional football in 2003 after being troubled by injuries at the age of 32.

After retirement
He later played amateur soccer for Alex Mamelodi Sundowns in the Alexandra Local Masters League. He was a football analyst at SuperSport. Kungwane was nicknamem "Kasi Flavour" for his top-class analysis of games that was relevant to people who lived in townships standards.

SuperSport have launched a highlight feature called Kasi Flavour, in his honour as a former analyst on the show.

Kungwane owned the Shakes Kungwane Alex Football Academy that was established two months before his death. The team made it to the preliminary stages of the 2014 Engen Knockout Challenge. The team took part in the Engen U17 tournament in July 2014. The team participates in the Alexandra Northrand Local Football Association.

References

External links

1971 births
People from Alexandra, Gauteng
South African soccer players
South Africa international soccer players
Association football midfielders
Kaizer Chiefs F.C. players
Manning Rangers F.C. players
2014 deaths
Sportspeople from Gauteng